On 6 May of 1405, a French army under the command of Waleran III, Count of Ligny and Saint-Pol besieged the English castle at Mercq in Pas-de-Calais.

Siege
The French siege proved futile as English reinforcements under Lieutenant of Calais Sir Richard Aston arrived with the Calais garrison to counterattack and lift the siege. Although surprised by the English attack the French troops manned the trenches, but the Genoese crossbowmen had no bolts and St. Pol's army suffered losses from English archers. The first to flee were the Flemings, quickly followed by the French and Genoese. Waleran III escaped with remnants of his army, but most were either killed or captured. The English captured all the French artillery, four standards, 60-80 prisoners including Jean de Hangest.

French Nobles Killed 
 Andrieux de Rambures, the captain of Boulogne and Gravelines, Governor of West Flanders
 Jean de Rambures, Governor of Arras
 Morel de Saveuse
 Guy Divrigny
 Courbet de Renty
 Martel de Vaulhuom
 Lord of Faiel 
 Lord of Cresecques

French Nobles taken Prisoner 
 David de Rambures 
 Jean V de Hangest
 Sarrazin Darby
 Captain of Boulogne
 Lord of Guiency 
 Lord of Noielle-sur-Sens 
 Lord of Brimeu
 Lord of Dampierre

References

Sources

161

Battles of the Hundred Years' War
Military history of the Pas-de-Calais
1405 in England
1400s in France
Conflicts in 1405